Feliniopsis africana is a moth of the family Noctuidae described by William Schaus and W. G. Clements in 1893.

Distribution
It is found in most countries of subtropical Africa, from Guinea and Ethiopia to South Africa.

References

Hadeninae
Moths described in 1893
Moths of Africa
Moths of Madagascar
Moths of São Tomé and Príncipe
Moths of the Middle East